Gongdan Station is a station of the Daegu Metro Line 3 in Bisan-dong, and Paldalno, Seo District, Daegu, South Korea. It is named after two industrial complexes.

Daegu Metro stations
Seo District, Daegu
Railway stations opened in 2015
2015 establishments in South Korea